The music of the Dominican Republic is primarily influenced by Western European music, with Sub-Saharan African and native Taino influences. The Dominican Republic is mainly known for its merengue and bachata music, both of which are the most famous styles of music in the Dominican Republic, and have been exported and popularized around the world.

Dominican music

Merengue

Merengue is a musical genre native to the Dominican Republic. It has a moderate to a very fast 2/4 rhythm played on güira (metal scraper) and the double-headed tambora. The accordion is also common. Traditional, accordion-based merengue is usually termed merengue típico and is still played by living accordionists like Francisco Ulloa, Fefita la Grande, El Ciego de Nagua, and Rafaelito Román. More modern merengues incorporate electric instruments and influences from salsa, and rock and roll. Choruses are often sung in a call and response form by two or three back-up singers, or more traditionally, by the musicians playing tambora or güira.  Beginning in the 1960s, dancing became a part of the singers' work with Johnny Ventura's Combo Show format, and is now a staple of many of the genre's biggest stars.  Lyrically, irony and double entendres are common 
Merengue continued to be limited in popularity to the lower classes, especially in the Cibao area, in the early 20th century.  Artists like Juan F. García, Juan Espínola and Julio Alberto Hernández tried to move merengue into the mainstream, but failed, largely due to social prejudices.  Some success occurred after nationalistic feelings arose among the Cibao elite who resented the U.S. occupation of the country from 1916 to 1924. Legend has it that at this time the faster (merengue típico cibaeño) was slowed down to accommodate American soldiers who couldn't dance the difficult steps of the merengue; this mid-tempo version was called pambiche. Major mainstream acceptance started with Rafael Trujillo's rise to power in the early 1930s.

Dictator Rafael Trujillo, who seized the presidency of the Dominican Republic in 1930, helped merengue to become a national symbol of the island up until his assassination in 1961.  Being that he was of humble origins, he had been barred from elite social clubs.  He was therefore resentful of these elite sophisticates and began promoting the Cibao-style merengue, forcing all social classes to participate in the low-class dance.  At Trujillo's command, virtually all musical groups had to compose merengues praising Trujillo's dictatorship, its guidelines and actions of his party.  Trujillo even made it mandatory for urban dance bands to include merengue in their repertoire.  Also, piano and brass instruments were added in merengue-oriented big bands, a trend towards upward mobility popularizing by Luis Alberti's group in Santiago de los Caballeros.  On the other hand, merengue that continued to use an accordion became known (rather disrespectfully) as perico ripiao (ripped parrot).  It was because of all this that merengue became and still is the Dominican Republic's national music and dance.
In the 1960s, a new group of artists (most famously Johnny Ventura) incorporated American R&B and rock and roll influences, along with Cuban salsa music.  The instrumentation changed, with accordion replaced with electric guitars or synthesizers, or occasionally sampled, and the saxophone's role totally redefined. In spite of the changes, merengue remained the most popular form of music in the Dominican Republic.  Ventura, for example, was so adulated that he became a massively popular and influential politician on his return from a time in the United States, and was seen as a national symbol.

The 1980s saw increasing Dominican emigration to Europe and the United States, especially to New York City and Miami.  Merengue came with them, bringing images of glitzy pop singers and idols.  At the same time, Juan Luis Guerra slowed down the merengue rhythm, and added more lyrical depth and entrenched social commentary.  He also incorporated bachata and Western musical influences with albums like 1990's critically acclaimed Bachata Rosa.

Música Congos del Espíritu Santo

Salves
Salve is a call-and-response type of singing that uses güira, panderos, palos (see next section) and other African instruments. Salves are highly ceremonial and are used in pilgrimages and at parties dedicated to voodoo saints. Salve is a ritual inspired by religion and music with roots in both African and Hispanic cultures. Salve is related to palo that is played in a lot of the same contexts and rhythm. The name comes from the Salve Regina, a catholic psalm, and many still sing a sacred, a cappella salve that preserves the medieval modes of old Spanish hymns. The ecstatic salve played at religious parties however, is all about percussion – featuring large numbers of tambourines playing interlocking rhythms and a melodic drum called the balsie, whose player alters the pitch by applying pressure with his foot. Salve may be played in fewer parts of the country but it's one of the best-known sounds, largely because it's the sound of choice in Villa Mella, a poor suburb of the capital often thought of as the epicenter of Afro-Dominican traditions. The salve group of Enerolisa Nuñez, from Villa Mella, is one of the most widely listened to - thanks to her inclusion in merengue-star Kinito Méndez's salve-merengue fusion album A Palo Limpio as well as an excellent recording of her group by the Bayahonda Cultural Foundation.

Palo

Palo, also known as Atabales and Salves is a Dominican sacred music that can be found throughout the island. The drum and human voice are the principal instruments. Palo is played at religious ceremonies - usually coinciding with saint's days - as well as for secular parties and special occasions. Its roots are in the Congo region of central-west Africa, but it is mixed with European influences in the melodies. Palos are related to Dominican folk Catholicism, which includes a pantheon of deities/saints (here termed misterios) much like those found in the Afro-American syncretic religious traditions of Cuba, Brazil, Haiti, Puerto Rico and elsewhere. Palos are usually associated with the lower class, black and mixed populations. They can be seen in different regions of Dominican Republic, but with variations.

Palo music is played on long drums termed palos. The word palos means trees, and therefore all Dominican palos drums are instruments made from hollowed out logs. The head of the drum is made of cowhide and it is attached to the log portion with hoops and pegs in the Eastern region, or with nails in the Southwest. There is a master drum (palo mayor) which is the large, wide drum played with slimmer drums (alcahuetes) alongside: two in the East or three elsewhere. Palos are usually played with guiras, which are metal scrapers. They may also be played with maracas, or a little stick used to hit the master drum, called the catá. The Dominican region in which the palos are played determines the form, the number of the instruments, and how they are played.

Palos are associated with the Dominican brotherhoods called cofradías. Originally, the brotherhoods were composed solely of males. As time progressed, females and family inheritance maintained the brotherhoods’ sanctity. Each brotherhood is devoted to a particular saint. Therefore, it is the responsibility of the brotherhood is to honor the saint with a festival. Historically, cofradías were established on principals similar to those of the Mediterranean guild-based societies and those founded by Africans that inhabited southern Spain. Through colonization and the slave trade, these traditions were brought to the Dominican Republic. However, the cofradías are not limited to the Dominican Republic, they are found in other parts of the Americas as well, where they may be adapted to Native-American folk Catholicism, particularly in Mexico and Central America.

Palo music is generally played at festivals honoring saints (velaciones) or during other religious events. The configuration of instruments present depends on the region in which these events take place. Palo drums are played with the hands, held between the legs, and tied to the palero's waist by a rope. The three paleros each play a distinct beat on their palos, which ultimately blend together. These rhythms vary depending on the region as well. For example, in the East, the "palo corrido" rhythm is popular, while in San Cristóbal, one may be more likely to find the "palo abajo" rhythm. While they play their drums, one of the paleros simultaneously sings verses of a song. The surrounding audience  often invokes spirits of ancestors or saints, and it is not unusual to encounter participants becoming possessed at these events.

Bachata

Bachata is a style of music that inhabitants of shantytowns call their own to own, meaning they call it theirs before anyone else gets it. Though this may seem like a negative connotation, one should remember that bachata has been widely accepted through many, though not all, classes of Dominican society. Bachata evolved from bolero, a Pan-American style said to have originated in Cuba. The guitars (lead, rhythm, and bass) are the principal instruments in bachata. They are accompanied by the bongo and güira

The Dominican bourgeoisie at first dismissed bachata as worthless and it was therefore given the name bachata, meaning a rowdy lower-class fiesta (party). Until fairly recently, bachata was informally banned from Dominican radio and television. Despite this, bachata flourished and has now gained wide acceptance, not only in the Dominican Republic, but worldwide. One of the most popular bands making bachata music was the former band Aventura, which split in 2011, but came back for a new album in 2019

Popular music

Dominican rock

Dominican rock is also popular among younger and older crowds of the Dominican Republic. Dominican rock is influenced by British and American rock, but also has its own sense of unique style. The rock scene in the Dominican Republic has been very vibrant in recent years, spanning many genres of rock such as pop rock, reggae/rock, punk, metal. Dominican rock had started its scene in the early 1980s, when Luis Días & Transporte Urbano, (who is considered to be the father of Dominican rock), came onto the scene and created this genre. Since then, there have been hundreds of Dominican rock bands, with the most successful being Toque Profundo, Cahobazul, Guaitiao, Tabu Tek, Al-Jadaqui Tribu del Sol, Joe Blandino, Edwin Amorfy, Vicente Garcia, Álex Ferreira, Top 40, TKR, Poket, La Siembra, La Reforma and others. Rita Indiana y los Misterios are a musical group known for their blend of traditional merengue music with rock. Bocatabu, Dronk, Futuros Divorciados and 42-01 are new Dominican rock groups who are also on the rise.

There are also several underground Metal concerts occurring occasionally mainly in the cities of Santo Domingo and Santiago, where teenagers and young adults usually not satisfied with the other genres express themselves.

Hip hop

Hip hop is a cultural movement developed in New York City in the 1970s primarily by African Americans and Afro-Latinos. Since first emerging in The Bronx and Harlem, the lifestyle of hip hop culture has today spread around the world. One of the places hip hop spread to was the Dominican Republic. The four historic elements of hip hop are: MCing (rapping), DJing, urban inspired art/tagging (graffiti), and b-boying (or breakdancing). The most known extended elements are beatboxing, hip hop fashion, and hip hop slang. All these elements have been carried on into the Dominican Republic since the mid 80s by young immigrants who returned to their mother land, usually from Puerto Rico, New York, Boston and Florida. Dominican hip hop started to gain national popularity in the years 2006 and 2007.

Dembow and Reggaeton

Reggaeton came to the Dominican Republic from Puerto Rico in the 90's. Dominican reggaeton is called by its original name dem-bow. Dembow uses old reggae and reggaeton beats from mainly Jamaica, Panama, and Puerto Rico. The dem-bow is utilized making the dem-dow rhythm faster and louder. Dominican recording artists include Black Point, Messiah El Artista, Monkey Black, Mozart La Para, Makleen, Juancho and Reychesta of Tres Coronas, Sensato del Patio, El Alfa, Chimbala and Don Miguelo.

Art music

Jazz
The most renowned exponent is Michel Camilo.

Classical music
Conservatorio Nacional de Música is the academy of music of the Dominican Republic. It was founded by José de Jesús Ravelo (Don Chuchú), one of the main Dominican composers.

References

Bibliography

Larrazábal Blanco, Carlos. 1967. "Los negros y la esclavitud en Santo Domingo". Santo Domingo: Postigo. Colección "Pensamiento Dominicano," No. 35.
Brill, Mark. Music of Latin America and the Caribbean, 2nd Edition, 2018. Taylor & Francis 
Davis, Martha Ellen. "Afro-Dominican Religious Brotherhoods: Structure, Ritual, and Music." 1976. Ph.D. dissertation in anthropology, University of Illinois
Díaz Díaz, Edgardo. 2008. “Danza antillana, conjuntos militares, nacionalismo musical e identidad dominicana: retomando los pasos perdidos del merengue.” Latin American Music Review 29(2): 229–259.
 Manuel, Peter, Kenneth M. Bilby, and Michael D. Largey. Caribbean Currents: Caribbean Music from Rumba to Reggae. Philadelphia: Temple University Press, 1995.
Harvey, Sean and Sue Steward. "Merengue Attacks". 2000.  In Broughton, Simon and Ellingham, Mark  with McConnachie, James and Duane, Orla (Ed.), World Music, Vol. 2: Latin & North America, Caribbean, India, Asia and Pacific, pp 414–420. Rough Guides Ltd, Penguin Books.

External links

www.iasorecords.com - Dominican Music, articles, music & video clips - bachata, merengue, Afro-Dominican, and more.
www.BachataRadio.com - Bachata, Merengue y mas! Musica en Demanda y en Vivo, Listen to the Music of the Dominican Republic.
All about Merengue Típico / Perico Ripiao
Popular Afro-Dominican Group in the United States
 https://listindiario.com/elnorte/2018/07/27/525954/anuncian-detalles-de-cibao-sonic-fest

 
Dominican styles of music